Julius Frankenberg was an American silent film actor and director. He starred in films such as The Haunted House, Personal Magnetism and A Blowout at Santa Banana working with actors such as Harry von Meter and Louise Lovely. He also directed two silent films.

Filmography
The Girl at the Cupola (1912)
Betty Fools Dear Old Dad (1912)
The Miller of Burgundy (1912) - a collector
Bread Upon the Waters (1912)
The Lost Inheritance (1912)
A Freight Train Drama (1912)
The False Order (1913)
The Understudy (1913)
A Husband Won by Election (1913)
The Food Chopper War (1913) - a drummer (billed as Julius Frankenberg)
Pauline Cushman, the Federal Spy (1913)
Arabia Takes the Health Cure (1913)
The Haunted House (1913)
Tobias Wants Out (1913)
Personal Magnetism (1913)
A Blowout at Santa Banana (1914)
The Cricket on the Hearth (1914)
Italian Love (1914)
The Peacock Feather Fan (1914)
The Sealed Package (1914)
The Land Just Over Yonder (Director, 1916)
Humanizing Mr. Winsby (Director, 1916)
Nine-Tenths of the Law (1918)

External links

American film directors
American male silent film actors
American male film actors
Year of birth missing
Place of birth missing
Year of death missing
Place of death missing
20th-century American male actors
Date of birth missing